The C Eighth Avenue Local is a  rapid transit service in the B Division of the New York City Subway. Its route emblem, or "bullet", is  since it uses the IND Eighth Avenue Line in Midtown Manhattan.

The C operates at all times except late nights between 168th Street in Washington Heights, Manhattan, and Euclid Avenue in East New York, Brooklyn, making all stops along its entire route. During late night hours, the  train, which runs express along the entire C route during daytime hours, makes all stops.

Historically, most C service ran only during rush hours, along the IND Concourse Line to Bedford Park Boulevard in the Bronx and later along the IND Rockaway Line to Rockaway Park–Beach 116th Street in Queens. Prior to 1985, the local C service was referred to as the CC, with the C designation reserved for a complementary express service that was discontinued in 1949. The CC was once the only route to serve the Bronx, Manhattan, Brooklyn, and Queens in a single trip. Outside of rush hour, local service in Manhattan was usually provided by the AA, later relabeled K, which ran between 168th Street and Chambers Street/World Trade Center. In 1988, the K and C were consolidated into one service, and during the 1990s, the C's routing was altered to create the current service pattern. , the C has a daily ridership of 250,000.

History

Original IND service
The AA and CC services were the predecessors to the current C service. A and AA service began on September 10, 1932 with the opening of the first line of the Independent Subway System (IND), the Eighth Avenue Line. The IND used single letters to refer to express services and double letters for local services. The A ran express and the AA ran local from 168th Street to Chambers Street/World Trade Center, known at the time as Hudson Terminal. The AA ran at all times, and it was extended to 207th Street during nights and on Sundays when the A did not run. On February 1, 1933, the AA was extended to the newly-opened Jay Street–Borough Hall station when the A did not run, continuing to terminate at Chambers Street when the A did run.

The C and CC services began operation on July 1, 1933 when the IND Concourse Line opened. The CC provided local service between Bedford Park Boulevard and Hudson Terminal during rush hours, and was extended to 205th Street during non-rush hours. It replaced the AA as Eighth Avenue Local. The C ran express, from 205th Street to Bergen Street in Brooklyn during rush hours, running express on the Concourse Line in the peak direction. C trains left Bergen Street between 3:30 p.m. and 6:50 p.m., and left 205th Street between 6:33 a.m. and 11:26 a.m. C trains ran every 4 minutes during rush hours in the peak direction, and every 5 minutes in the reverse-peak direction, and ran with 6- and 7-car trains. During morning rush hours, CC trains operated to 205th Street until 7:30 a.m., and to Tremont Avenue between 7:30 a.m. and 11:30 a.m.. PM rush hour CC trains terminated at Bedford Park Boulevard, and several other trains terminated and originated at Bedford Park Boulevard. CC trains ran every 4 minutes during rush hours, 5 minutes during middays, every 5 and 6 trains during evenings, and every 12 minutes overnight. Trains ran with 5 cars during rush hours, and with 3 cars other times. On August 17, 1933, CC trains stopped terminating at Tremont Avenue. Beginning August 19, 1933, C service was cut back from Bergen Street, but started operating during non-rush hours. At the same time, CC service was cut back from 205th Street during non-rush hours.

On January 1, 1936, C service was extended to Jay Street–Borough Hall. On April 9, 1936, C service was extended to Hoyt–Schermerhorn Streets. After July 1, 1937, a few C trains continued to run to Bergen Street southbound in the morning rush hour and northbound in the evening rush hour. Also on the same date, weekend C service was discontinued, and CC service was extended to 205th Street to compensate.

IND Sixth Avenue Line opens

On December 15, 1940, the IND Sixth Avenue Line opened. These lines ran on the Eighth Avenue Line in upper Manhattan, switching to the Sixth Avenue Line in Midtown. The BB ran local to 168th Street during rush hours. The D joined the C as the peak direction Concourse Express. CC trains now ran between Hudson Terminal and Bedford Park during rush hours and on Saturdays and during other times, the D made local stops in the Bronx, replacing CC service. On the same date, limited morning rush hour service began between 205th Street, Bronx and Utica Avenue, Brooklyn, making local stops on the IND Fulton Street Line. AA service was reinstated during this time, but only during off-peak hours (non-rush hours, late Saturday afternoons and Sundays) when the BB and CC did not operate. The CC would provide Eighth Avenue Line local service during rush hours, with the AA replacing it during off-peak hours, mostly unchanged until 1988.

In the 1940s, C trains ran every 10 minutes during rush hour, CC trains ran every 4 minutes, and D trains ran every 5 minutes.

On October 24, 1949, C express service was discontinued. Additional D service was added to offset this loss. The CC, which only ran during rush hours, began terminating at Broadway–Lafayette Street Mondays to Fridays, and on Saturdays CC service continued to operate to Hudson Terminal. On December 29, 1951, Saturday CC service was discontinued. Weekday CC service returned to its previous terminal at Hudson Terminal on October 30, 1954.

On August 30, 1976, the CC train replaced the  train as the rush-hour local along the IND Fulton Street Line and IND Rockaway Line, running from Rockaway Park–Beach 116th Street in Queens through Brooklyn and Manhattan to Bedford Park Boulevard in the Bronx, making it the only service to run through all four boroughs served by the subway. The Rockaway Park Shuttle HH was renamed CC. This shuttle ran between Broad Channel and Rockaway Park during off-peak hours, except late nights.  With this, all daytime service to and from Rockaway Park was named CC. Late nights, the shuttle ran between Euclid Avenue, Rockaway Park and Far Rockaway–Mott Avenue via Hammels Wye, and was labeled A.

On August 28, 1977, late night AA service was eliminated. The A began making local stops in Manhattan during late nights, when the AA was not running.

On May 6, 1985, the IND practice of using double letters to indicate local service was discontinued. The AA was renamed the K and rush hour CC service was renamed C. The off-peak Rockaway Park Shuttle was renamed . This change was not officially reflected in schedules until May 24, 1987.

Modern service consolidations
On December 10, 1988, the K designation was discontinued and merged into the C, which now ran at all times except late nights. The C ran from Bedford Park Boulevard to Rockaway Park during rush hours, 145th Street to Euclid Avenue during middays, and from 145th Street to World Trade Center during evenings and weekends. The A now ran express in Brooklyn during middays, and the B was extended to 168th Street during middays and early evenings.

On October 23, 1992, rush hour C service was cut back from Rockaway Park–Beach 116th Street to Euclid Avenue. The 1992 change introduced five A trips in each direction run from 59th Street–Columbus Circle to Rockaway Park during rush hours, with the Rockaway Park Shuttle (renamed from H to S) operating between Broad Channel and Rockaway Park at all times.

On May 29, 1994, weekend service between 7 a.m. and 11 p.m. was extended to Washington Heights–168th Street (effectively recreating the old AA) to allow A trains to run express. Beginning April 30, 1995, C service was extended to 168th Street during middays as construction on the Manhattan Bridge cut B service from Manhattan. On November 11, 1995, midday service was cut back to 145th Street after B service to 168th Street was restored.

The B and the C, which both ran local along Central Park West, switched northern terminals on March 1, 1998, ending the connection between the C and the Bronx. Instead of alternating between three different terminals depending on the time of day, all C service now terminated at 168th Street. The change was made to reduce crowding on the C and to reduce passenger confusion about the C's route.

Starting on May 2, 1999, C trains were extended to Euclid Avenue on evenings and weekends; The 1999 change had the C now run local in Brooklyn and Manhattan, and the A express, at all times except late nights.

In the wake of the September 11, 2001 attacks, World Trade Center station was temporarily not usable as a terminal for the E. C service was suspended until September 24, 2001. Local service along Central Park West was replaced by the A and D, and the E was extended from Canal Street to Euclid Avenue replacing C service in Brooklyn.

On January 23, 2005, a fire at the Chambers Street signal room crippled A and C service. C service was suspended until February 2 and was replaced by the A, B, D, E, and V along different parts of its route. Initial assessments suggested that it would take several years to restore normal service, but the damaged equipment was replaced with available spare parts, and normal service resumed on April 21.

From midday on March 29, 2020 to April 29, 2020, C trains were suspended due to the COVID-19 pandemic in New York City, and A trains to Lefferts Boulevard ran local in their place.

Maintenance and rider issues

Criticism
In August 2012, the Straphangers Campaign rated the C train the worst of the city's subway services for the fourth straight year. No other service has ranked worst for more than three years in a row. The group found that the C performed worst in three of the six categories in its annual State of the Subways Report Card: amount of scheduled service, interior cleanliness, and breakdown rate. It also ranked next-to-worst in car announcement quality, after the 7, but performed above average in regularity of service and crowding. The New York Times called the C the "least loved of New York City subway lines", citing its fleet of R32s, which were almost 50 years old at the time the Times reported on the issue. The New York Times has also stated that the C train "rattled and clanked along the deteriorating maze of tracks beneath the city, tin-clad markers of years of neglect." In 2017, the Times referred to the R32s on the C as the world's oldest subway cars "in continuous daily operation". The R32s were initially retired in late April 2020, but were temporarily pressed back into service from July through October 2020 and finally retired in early January 2022.

In January 2020, the R179 fleet that replaced the R32 was pulled from service due to two incidents involving R179 cars. This resulted in some service cutbacks that were later somewhat reverted when the R179s were investigated and placed back into service. However, due to the COVID-19 pandemic in New York City and too few crews to run trains, the route was suspended entirely from March 29 to April 29, 2020, when C trains began running 75 percent of normal service. The cutbacks meant that wait times during rush hours increased from 8 to 12 minutes. In March 2021, TWU 100, the union for subway workers, sued the MTA in order to prevent the reduced frequencies from being permanent. That same month, the MTA decided to bring back full C service; full service was restored in mid-2021.

Improvements
In 2011, problems with the R32s were at a peak as the fleet's failure rate was rising steadily. In 2012, money was directed to replace the R32 with the R179. Bombardier Transportation won the $600 million contract to build 300 new cars. The R179s were expected to replace the R32s with some being allocated to the C. However, delivery of the R179s was delayed until 2017 and the R32s momentarily remained in service after the order was completed, so stopgap measures were implemented.

In the summer of 2010, some 600-foot-long R44 trains ran on the C, displacing some R32s, whose air conditioning units were repaired. In the summers of 2011 and 2012, some 600-foot-long R46 trains were used on the C, while the R32s were used on the A, which had significant outdoor sections where the air conditioning units did not have to be used. In the summers of 2013 and 2014 as well as from May 2015 to February 2019, some 480-foot-long R160As ran on the C, covering half of its fleet, because of the R32s' continuously aging air compressors caused by the entirely underground C route. Concurrently, some R32s in exchange were transferred to East New York Yard, where they were used on the mostly outdoor . On December 16, 2017, after several failed proposals to permanently lengthen C trains as ridership increased, some 600-foot-long R46 trains were reassigned to the C, displacing some more R32s, which were reassigned to the A.

On November 6, 2018, some 480-foot-long R179 trains started running on the C, gradually displacing the R160As back to East New York Yard by February 6, 2019. Since delivery of the R179s, they have periodically experienced major mechanical and technical issues, forcing the MTA to remove them from service system-wide for brief periods of time to allow these issues to be corrected.

Route

Service pattern 
The following table shows the lines used by the C:

Stations 

For a more detailed station listing, see the articles on the lines listed above.

Notes

References

External links 

 MTA NYC Transit – C Eighth Avenue Local
 
 
 MTA NYC Transit – A C Line Review
 Main Document

New York City Subway services